Adalberto Peñaranda Maestre (born 31 May 1997) is a Venezuelan professional footballer who plays as a striker for Portuguese Primeira Liga club Boavista and the Venezuela national team.

Club career

Early career
Peñaranda was born in El Vigía, Alberto Adriani Municipality, Mérida. He is an academy graduate of Deportivo La Guaira and made his professional and Primera División debuts on 11 August 2013, starting in a 1–3 home loss against Deportivo Táchira. Peñaranda scored his first goal as a senior on 23 February 2014, netting his team's only goal in a 1–4 loss at Caracas FC. He finished the 2013–14 Venezuelan Primera División season with 18 appearances to his name, and one goal.

The Pozzo Triangle

Udinese, Granada & Watford
On 16 June 2015, Peñaranda signed for Serie A side Udinese, owned by Italian businessman Giampaolo Pozzo. He was then immediately loaned to Granada who at the time were also under the ownership of Pozzo. He made his debut for the La Liga side on 22 November, starting in a 2–0 home win against Athletic Bilbao. Upon making his debut he became the youngest ever player to ever represent the club. On 12 December 2015, Peñaranda scored his first goals in the top flight of Spanish football, netting a brace in a 2–1 away win against Levante UD. In doing so he became the youngest ever non-Spanish player to score a brace in La Liga, breaking the record previously held by Barcelona's Argentine forward, Lionel Messi.

On 1 February of the following year he signed a four-and-a-half-year deal with Premier League side Watford, owned by Pozzo's son Gino, but remained on loan at Granada for the remainder of the season. At the end of the season Granada were sold to Chinese firm Link International Sports, putting pay to the possibility of Peñaranda returning to the club on loan for another season. Following his arrival at Watford in July, Peñaranda was shipped back to Udinese on a season long loan deal. Granada had agreed to loan Peñaranda while Watford waited for him to qualify for a work permit to play in England.

He made his debut for the Udinese on 13 August 2016, coming on as a second-half substitute for Ryder Matos in a 3–2 Coppa Italia loss to Spezia. His Serie A debut came the following week in a 4–0 drubbing at the hands of Roma, with Peñaranda coming on as a second-half substitute for Rodrigo De Paul.

Peñaranda made his Watford first team debut against Woking in the 3rd round of the FA Cup on 6 January 2019.

Loan to Málaga

On 5 January 2017, it was announced that Peñaranda had been recalled from Udinese and would spend the remainder of the season on loan with La Liga side Málaga. The deal included an option for Málaga to extend the loan by a further season.

Return to Watford
Upon his return to Watford he scored his first goal for the club in an EFL Cup tie against Coventry City on 27 August 2019.

Loan to Eupen
On 2 September 2019, Adalberto Peñaranda moved to Eupen on a one-year loan.

Loan to CSKA Sofia
On 5 October 2020, Adalberto Peñaranda moved to CSKA Sofia on a one-year loan.

Loan to Las Palmas
On 12 July 2021, Peñaranda returned to Spain after signing a one-year loan deal with UD Las Palmas in the second division.

Career statistics

Club

International

Personal life
On 18 April 2015, Peñaranda and  Deportivo La Guaira teammate Charlis Ortiz were both shot in an attempted robbery after attending a party. Peñaranda was struck in the left thigh with the bullet passing clean through. Ortiz, however, was struck in the rib area and had to undergo surgery the following day.

Honours

Club
Deportivo La Guaira
Copa Venezuela: 2014

International
Venezuela U20
FIFA U-20 World Cup: Runner-up 2017

Venezuela U-17
South American Under-17 Football Championship: Runner-Up 2013

CSKA Sofia
 Bulgarian Cup: 2020–21

References

External links

1997 births
People from Mérida (state)
Living people
Venezuelan footballers
Venezuela youth international footballers
Venezuela under-20 international footballers
Venezuela international footballers
Association football forwards
Deportivo La Guaira players
Udinese Calcio players
Granada CF footballers
Watford F.C. players
Málaga CF players
K.A.S. Eupen players
PFC CSKA Sofia players
UD Las Palmas players
Boavista F.C. players
Venezuelan Primera División players
La Liga players
Segunda División B players
Serie A players
Belgian Pro League players
First Professional Football League (Bulgaria) players
Segunda División players
Copa América Centenario players
Venezuelan expatriate footballers
Expatriate footballers in Italy
Venezuelan expatriate sportspeople in Italy
Expatriate footballers in Spain
Venezuelan expatriate sportspeople in Spain
Expatriate footballers in England
Venezuelan expatriate sportspeople in England
Expatriate footballers in Belgium
Venezuelan expatriate sportspeople in Belgium
Expatriate footballers in Bulgaria
Venezuelan expatriate sportspeople in Bulgaria
Expatriate footballers in Portugal
Venezuelan expatriate sportspeople in Portugal